(known as  FC Ladies for short) is a women's football club playing in Japan's top women's football league, Nadeshiko League Division 1.

The team is affiliated with the Nippon Sport Science University based in Yokohama. The team also participates in the Kanto University League, Kanagawa Prefecture League, and Tokyo League. In June 2015, the team signed a sponsorship agreement with "Fields Corporation" (ja) and team name was changed to "Nippon Sport Science University Fields Yokohama".

Squad

Current squad

Results

Supporter's Club
Nittaidai Ladies FC is supported by the Blue "S" Supporters Club.

Transition of team name
Nippon Sport Science University LSC : 1985 - 2014
Nippon Sport Science University SC Yokohama : 2015
Nippon Sport Science University Fields Yokohama : 2015 – Present

References

External links 
 Nittaidai FC Ladies official site
 Nippon Sport Science University L.S.C. official site (archived)
 List of women's football clubs in Japan

Women's football clubs in Japan
1985 establishments in Japan
Japan Women's Football League teams
Sports teams in Yokohama